Daemon X Machina is a Mecha third-person shooter action game developed and published by Marvelous. It was originally released for the Nintendo Switch on September 13, 2019 then later ported to Microsoft Windows on February 13, 2020. Armored Core producer Kenichiro Tsukuda has stated that a sequel is in development.

Gameplay
In the game, the player controls a custom player character, who commands an Arsenal mech and engages in battle with other mech enemies. The player avatar's stats, abilities, and appearance can be customized in the Hangar, which serves as the game's main hub. The Hangar is also the area where players create their custom Arsenal using body parts bought or collected throughout the game. It is also the place where players browse through different missions for both single player and online cooperative multiplayer.

Plot
After a moon collided with the Planet, it radiated a special energy that turned artificial intelligence against humanity. The Outers, a group of pilots who command mechs, gained special abilities after being afflicted by the mysterious energy. They act as humanity's protectors and guardians as the war with the Arms of Immortals (AIs) rages on.

Development
The game entered production around mid 2017. It was announced at E3 2018. Kenichiro Tsukuda, who produced the Armored Core series, served as the game's producer, while Yūsuke Kozaki provided character designs.  A limited time special demo was released on February 14, 2019. The game features a vibrant color palette, a choice made by the development team to ensure that the game could be visually appealing and unique. The team also injected a lot of rock and metal elements into the game music, composed by several composers including Junichi Nakatsuru and Rio Hamamoto of Bandai Namco. It was released on September 13, 2019, published by Marvelous in Japan and Nintendo worldwide.

A port of Daemon X Machina for Microsoft Windows was released on February 13, 2020. While this version does exclude some of the licensed downloadable content, it otherwise contains all other content released from the Nintendo Switch version. In December 2020 an update allowed for the transfer of saves between the Switch and Windows versions.

Reception and legacy 

At launch, Daemon X Machina received "mixed or average reviews" according to review aggregator Metacritic. The game has since improved through its post-launch content and updates. To help promote the release of Daemon X Machina on the Nintendo Switch, Super Smash Bros. Ultimate hosted a special five-day limited event where players could obtain four spirits featuring characters with their mechs from the game.

Sales
Daemon X Machina launched at #4 on the Japanese charts, and #19 on the U.K. physical charts. As of October 2019, the game has sold more than 42,217 physical copies in Japan. Marvelous has stated that Daemon X Machina has done "very well" on the Nintendo Switch.

References

External links
 

2019 video games
Cooperative video games
Video games about mecha
Nintendo Switch games
Post-apocalyptic video games
Third-person shooters
Video games developed in Japan
Video games featuring protagonists of selectable gender
Video games scored by Junichi Nakatsuru
Unreal Engine games
Action video games
Nintendo games
Windows games
Marvelous (company) games
Xseed Games games
Multiplayer and single-player video games